Vasiliy Bubka (born 26 November 1960 in Voroshilovgrad) is a retired pole vaulter who represented the USSR and later Ukraine. His personal best was 5.86 metres, achieved in July 1988 in Chelyabinsk.

Bubka is the older brother of pole vaulting world record holder Sergey Bubka and father of pole vaulter Oleksandr Bubka, born 1986.

Achievements

External links

1960 births
Living people
Sportspeople from Luhansk
Ukrainian male pole vaulters
Soviet male pole vaulters
Athletes (track and field) at the 1996 Summer Olympics
Olympic athletes of Ukraine
European Athletics Championships medalists
World Athletics Indoor Championships medalists
Competitors at the 1986 Goodwill Games
Competitors at the 1994 Goodwill Games